The 1982–83 Boston College Eagles men's basketball team represented Boston College as members of the Big East Conference during the 1982–83 NCAA Division I men's basketball season.

Roster

Schedule and results

|-
!colspan=12 style=| Regular Season

|-
!colspan=12 style=| Big East Tournament

|-
!colspan=12 style=| NCAA Tournament

Sources

Rankings

References

Boston College Eagles men's basketball seasons
Boston College Eagles
Boston College
Boston Coll
Boston Coll